Giovanni Conti (died April 9, 1909) was an Italian painter, mainly of sacred subjects.

He was a pupil of Luigi Pastore in Aversa. He painted Trumpet of the Last Judgement, (1865), Resurrection of Lazarus (1869), and Death of Abel (1869). He participated in Neapolitan Promotrice exhibitions.

References

1909 deaths
19th-century Italian painters
Italian male painters
20th-century Italian painters
20th-century Italian male artists
Year of birth unknown
19th-century Italian male artists